The Magnetes were an ancient Greek tribe. In book 2 of the Iliad, Homer includes them in the Greek Army that is besieging Troy, and identifies their homeland in Thessaly, in a part that is still known as Magnesia. They later also contributed to the Greek colonisation by founding two prosperous cities in Western Anatolia, Magnesia on the Maeander and Magnesia ad Sipylum.

Mythology 
According to the Hesiodic Catalogue of Women ( 7), Thyia, a daughter of Deucalion, lay with Zeus and bore two sons: Magnes and Makednos, the eponyms of the Magnetes and Macedones, respectively. Within Thyia's extended family in the Catalogue are found the progenitors of several of the other early Greek tribes. Her sister Pandora II (named after her grandmother, the famous Pandora) bore Graecus (also to Zeus). And their brother Hellen, along with his three sons Dorus, Xuthus (with his sons Ion and Achaeus) and Aeolos, filled out the set of progenitors of the ancient tribes that formed the Greek/Hellenic nation.

Family tree

References

Ancient tribes in Greece
Greek tribes
Trojan War
Ancient tribes in Thessaly